The following is a list of notable individuals who were born in and/or have lived in Dodge City, Kansas.

Arts and entertainment

Film, television, and theatre
 Madge Blake (1899–1969), actress
 Eddie Foy, Sr.  (1856–1928), actor, comedian, dancer
 Dennis Hopper (1936–2010), actor

Music
 Chris Estes (1971–), bass guitarist
 James King (1925–2005), opera singer

Other visual arts
 Billy Al Bengston (1934–), artist, sculptor

Crime and law enforcement

 Clay Allison (1840–1887), gunfighter
 Charlie Bassett (1847–1896), lawman
 Chalkley Beeson (1848–1912), businessman, lawman
 Big Nose Kate (1850–1940), companion of Doc Holliday
 William L. Brooks (1832–1874), lawman, outlaw
 Shotgun John Collins (1851–1922), gunfighter
 James Earp (1841–1926), lawman, saloon keeper
 Virgil Earp (1843–1905), lawman
 Wyatt Earp (1848–1929), lawman
 Dora Hand (1844–1878), dance hall singer, murder victim
 Doc Holliday (1851–1887), gambler, gunfighter
 James H. "Dog" Kelley (1833–1912), mayor of Dodge City from 1877 to 1881, founder of Kelly Opera House, briefly supervised law-enforcement career of Wyatt Earp
 Frank Loving (1860–1882), gambler, gunfighter
 Bat Masterson (1853–1921), lawman, sports journalist
 Ed Masterson (1852–1878), lawman
 James Masterson (1855–1895), lawman
 Mysterious Dave Mather (1851–1886), gunfighter, lawman
 Levi Richardson (1851–1879), buffalo hunter, gunfighter
 Mary Lou Robinson (1926–2019), United States District Court judge
 Luke Short (1854–1893), gunfighter
 Charlie Siringo (1855–1928), detective, author
 Libby Thompson (1855–1953), dancer, prostitute
 Bill Tilghman (1854–1924), lawman
 Texas Jack Vermillion (1842–1911), gunfighter
 John Joshua Webb (1847–1882), gunfighter, outlaw

Military
 John E. Gingrich (1897–1960), U.S. Navy Admiral

Politics

National
 Charles N. Lamison (1826–1896), U.S. Representative from Ohio
 Edmond H. Madison (1865–1911), U.S. Representative from Kansas
 Pat Roberts (1936–), U.S. Senator from Kansas

State
 Fred Hall (1916–1970), 33rd Governor of Kansas
 Robert Dean Hunter (1928–2023), member of the Texas House of Representatives from 1986 to 2007; first Republican to represent Abilene, Texas, since Reconstruction; vice-president emeritus of Abilene Christian University 
 Robert M. Wright (1840–1915), one of the founders of Dodge City; member of the Kansas House of Representatives from 1875 to 1883; one-term mayor of Dodge City

Religion
 David Ricken (1952–), Roman Catholic bishop

Sports
 Robert Delpino (1965–), football player
 Sean James (1969–), football player, model
 Nat Love (1854–1921), rodeo cowboy
 Bill Miller (1912–2008), Olympic gold medalist 1932
 Sputnik Monroe (1928–2006), pro wrestler
 Lance Nichols (1939–), baseball player, manager

Fiction
 Matt Dillon, fictional U.S. Marshal of Dodge City featured on both the radio and television versions of Gunsmoke

See also

 Lists of people from Kansas

References

Dodge City, Kansas
Dodge City